Lake of the Woods is a census-designated place (CDP) in Navajo County, Arizona, United States. The population was 4,094 at the 2010 census.

Geography
Drysdale is located at  (34.154761, −109.993637).

Demographics

As of the 2010 census, there were 4,094 people living in the CDP: 2,078 male and 2,016 female. 1,185 were 19 years old or younger, 610 were ages 20–34, 744 were between the ages of 35 and 49, 907 were between 50 and 64, and the remaining 648 were aged 65 and above. The median age was 41.4 years.

The racial makeup of the CDP was 86.1% White, 2.4% American Indian, 0.7% Asian, 0.6% Black or African American, 7.6% Other, and 2.5% two or more races.  19.6% of the population were Hispanic or Latino of any race.

There were 1,607 households in the CDP, 1,093 family households (68.0%) and 514 non-family households (32.0%), with an average household size of 2.54. Of the family households, 815 were married couples living together, while 91 were single fathers and 187 were single mothers; the non-family households included 418 adults living alone: 221 male and 197 female.

The CDP contained 2,859 housing units, of which 1,607 were occupied and 1,252 were vacant.

References

Census-designated places in Navajo County, Arizona